Lake Parker may refer to:

 Lake Parker (Florida), a lake in Lakeland, Florida
 Lake Parker, a lake west of Lake Wales, Florida
 Lake Parker (Vermont),  a lake in Orleans County, Vermont